General elections were held in Mexico on 11 March 1917. The result was an overwhelming victory for Venustiano Carranza of the Liberal Constitutionalist Party, who received 97% of the vote.

Results

President

References

Presidential elections in Mexico
Mexico
General
March 1917 events
Election and referendum articles with incomplete results